Badgemaster is a British-based business that manufactures badges, based near Nottingham, United Kingdom. The company was founded and is owned by John Bancroft.

The company has received a number of notable awards, including the "Bridge to Work" Award in 1997, following its work in the Nottinghamshire community.

History
The company was founded in 1992 by John and Vicky Bancroft. In the first year of operation, it was reported that the company operated from a portacabin in Nottinghamshire. The company was founded after Bancroft spent a number of years in the corporate clothing industry.

In 1993, the company moved to a purpose built factory on the site of the former Newstead Colliery. The company have remained on this site and have extended the factory to its present 12,500 square feet.

In 1997, Badgemaster received an award from Nottinghamshire County Council following its job creation and staff training in the area. At the time, it was quoted that a number of the staff members lived within the local community of Newstead, Nottinghamshire. Nottinghamshire County Council quoted that the company had become an integral part of the community and awarded Badgemaster with the inaugural "Bridge to Work" Award. Before the establishment of Badgemaster in the area, it was widely reported that job opportunities were lacking in Newstead, Nottinghamshire. Newstead was formerly known as Newstead Colliery Village and suffered large scale Unemployment following the closure of the mines during the 1980s, which were widespread throughout in the United Kingdom.

The company began to work with the British Royal Family in 2006. Badgemaster expanded over the following years, working with a number of major brands, becoming one of the largest badge manufactures and providers in Europe.

In 2010, The British Standards Institute accredited the Badgemaster factory with ISO 9001 for their quality management standards and in 2013 accredited the company to ISO14001 for their environmental standards. Badgemaster were the first company in the badge manufacturing industry to gain this accreditation.

In 2013, the company founder was awarded a Member of the Most Excellent Order of the British Empire, otherwise known as an MBE. The announcement had come a number of months prior.

Badgemaster announced a takeover of the Scottish-based Akorn Badge Company, one of their major UK competitors in 2014. Following the takeover of the company, the operations were moved to Badgemaster's Nottinghamshire headquarters. Akorn had been part of the badge market for over 30 years, before the Badgemaster acquisition.

In 2016, the company received three awards at the Professional Clothing Awards. The awards included best IT innovation, Made in the UK award, and Best Manufacturer/Distributor. In 2017, the company's founders were presented with a lifetime achievement award at the Professional Clothing Awards for their contributions to the industry.

Royal appointments and honours
Since the company's foundation, they have received a number of honours from the British_Royal_Family. Their association with the British Royals started in 2006, when Badgemaster received a Royal warrant of appointment.

Badgemaster's work in the community led to the company founder was awarded a Member of the Most Excellent Order of the British Empire as part of Queen Elizabeth's Birthday Honours.

References

External links 
 
 Badges UK
Manufacturing companies of England
Companies based in Nottinghamshire
British companies established in 1992
1992 establishments in England